Pocahontas Historic District is a national historic district located at Pocahontas in the Pocahontas coalfield, Tazewell County, Virginia. It is near Pocahontas Exhibition Coal Mine, a U.S. National Historic Landmark which was Mine No. 1 of the Pocahontas coalfield.  The district encompasses 17 contributing buildings and 1 contributing structure in the town of Pocahontas.  Notable buildings include the City Hall (1895), the stone Episcopal Methodist Church, Catholic Church, the old brick medical dispensary, a Synagogue, the first millinery shop in the coalfields (now the Emma Yates Memorial Library) and a Masonic Hall.

It was listed on the National Register of Historic Places in 1972.

References

Historic districts in Tazewell County, Virginia
National Register of Historic Places in Tazewell County, Virginia
Historic districts on the National Register of Historic Places in Virginia